Xerolenta is a genus of air-breathing land snails, terrestrial pulmonate gastropod molluscs in the family Geomitridae, the harry snails and their allies.

Species 
Species in the genus Xerolenta include:

Synonyms
 Xerolenta candicans Pfeiffer, 1841: synonym of Helicella obvia (Menke, 1828)
Taxon inquiriendum
 Xerolenta depulsa (L. Pintér, 1969)

References

 Kobelt, W. (1892). Literaturbericht. Nachrichtsblatt der Deutschen Malakozoologischen Gesellschaft, 24 (7/8): 149-152. Frankfurt am Main
 Schütt, H. (1962). Eine gekielte Helicella aus Thrazien. Archiv für Molluskenkunde, 91 (4/6): 151-156. Frankfurt am Main
 Bank, R. A. (2017). Classification of the Recent terrestrial Gastropoda of the World. Last update: July 16th, 2017

External links 

Geomitridae